The Epitaph World Tour was a concert tour by English heavy metal band Judas Priest, at the time intended to be the band's farewell tour. The tour commenced in June 2011 and concluded in May 2012. The tour was named after the 6th track from their Sad Wings of Destiny album.

Guitarist K. K. Downing abruptly left the band shortly before the start of the tour. He was replaced by then 31-year-old Briton, Richie Faulkner. The last date of the tour was held in an unusually small venue, London's Hammersmith Apollo. This return to Judas Priest's homeland was filmed for a live DVD.

Epitaph would ultimately turn out not to be the band's final tour, as they embarked on the Redeemer of Souls Tour two years later.

Production

On 10 May, the band announced that preparations for the tour had begun, including rehearsals, photos, stage construction, and special effects.

On 6 June, guitarist Glenn Tipton announced on his website that:

Rob Halford incident
On the 15 September 2011 show in Brasília, Rob Halford fell off his Harley-Davidson motorcycle when he rode across the stage, only to slip off as "Hell Bent for Leather" was set to be performed. This was reminiscent of an incident that occurred on the Operation Rock & Roll tour in 1991, but this time he did not sustain any major injuries. He was assisted by crew members as the intro piece began, and finished the show thereafter.

Tour dates

Setlist
According to a posting on Tipton's website on 27 January 2011, the tour will "include some classic Priest songs that we haven't played before -- and of course, the old favourites that everybody will want to hear." On 15 February, the band announced they were considering playing at least one song from each of their albums as part of the setlist.

The setlist for the first leg of the tour was as follows:

 "Battle Hymn"
 "Rapid Fire"
 "Metal Gods"
 "Heading Out to the Highway"
 "Judas Rising"
 "Starbreaker"
 "Victim of Changes"
 "Never Satisfied"
 "Diamonds and Rust" (acoustic to heavy version)
 "Prophecy"
 "Night Crawler"
 "Turbo Lover"
 "Beyond the Realms of Death"
 "The Sentinel"
 "Blood Red Skies"
 "The Green Manalishi (with the Two Prong Crown)"
 "Breaking the Law"
 "Painkiller"
 
 "The Hellion"/"Electric Eye"
 "Hell Bent for Leather"
 "You've Got Another Thing Comin'"
 
 "Living After Midnight"

Note: The band played a shorter set with omitted songs at certain festival appearances.

Reviews
A review of the band's performance at the Sonisphere Festival in Basel, Switzerland by RockAAA.com was favourable, praising both Rob Halford's vocal performance and Richie Faulkner's guitar playing. The reviewer said that Halford's "tone is astonishing...and [his] delivery as good as there is in the business."

Support acts
 Black Label Society (12 October – 3 December 2011)
 Crash (4 February 2012)
 Diablo ft. Yim Jae-beom (4 February 2012)
 Duff McKagan's Loaded (20 June 2011)
 Exodus (10 August 2011)
 HammerFall (22–25 April 2012)
 Hatebreed (3 July 2011)
 Kobra and the Lotus (26 May 2012)
 Lamb of God (20 February 2012)
 Morbid Angel (10 August 2011)
 Motörhead (29 July – 2 August 2011)
 Queensrÿche (15–27 July 2011)
 Rival Sons (15–24 July 2011)
 Sabaton (9 August 2011)
 Saxon (29 July – 2 August 2011; 23–26 May 2012)
 Thin Lizzy (12 October – 3 December 2011; 27 April – 4 May 2012)
 Vader (10 August 2011)
 Whitesnake (27 June – 10 July 2011; 10 September – 3 October 2011)
 Leash Eye (14 April 2012)

Personnel
 Rob Halford – lead vocals
 Glenn Tipton – guitar
 Richie Faulkner – guitar
 Ian Hill – bass
 Scott Travis – drums

References

External links
Announcement of tour by Judas Priest
Current tour dates

2011 concert tours
2012 concert tours
Judas Priest concert tours
Farewell concert tours